Victor/Victoria is a 1995 videotaped television production of the Broadway musical of the same name written and directed by Blake Edwards, starring Julie Andrews, Tony Roberts, Michael Nouri, Rachel York, Richard B. Shull and Gregory Jbara. The play's opening night performance on October 25, 1995 at the Marquis Theatre in New York City was filmed exclusively for Japanese television broadcast by NHK on December 23, 1995. It was directed for the stage by Edwards and directed for television by Matthew Diamond and Goro Kobayashi.

Synopsis
Victoria (Andrews) is a penniless out-of-work singer whose life is changed when she meets the flamboyant gay impresario Toddy (Roberts) and, with his help, she becomes "Victor", an overnight singing sensation in the nightclubs of Paris. But success becomes hilariously complicated when she meets the love of her life – King Marchand (Nouri), a macho Chicago gangster – who sees the act and finds himself attracted to the star.

Cast 
Julie Andrews as Victoria Grant
Tony Roberts as Carroll "Toddy" Todd
Michael Nouri as King Marchand
Rachel York as Norma Cassidy
Richard B. Shull as André Cassell
Gregory Jbara as Squash (Mr. Bernstein)

Musical numbers 
 "Paris by Night" – Toddy & Les Boys
 "If I Were a Man" – Victoria
 "Trust Me" – Toddy & Victoria
 "Le Jazz Hot" – Victor and Ensemble
 "The Tango/Paris by Night" – Victor & Norma
 "Paris Makes Me Horny" – Norma
 "Crazy World" – Victoria
 "Louis Says" – Victor & Ensemble
 "King's Dilemma" – King Marchand
 "You & Me" – Toddy and Victor
 "Paris by Night (Reprise)" – Street Singer
 "Almost a Love Song" – King Marchand and Victoria
 "Chicago, Illinois" – Norma & The Girls
 "Living in the Shadows" – Victoria
 "Victor/Victoria" – Victoria, Toddy & Company

Home media
Performances of Victor/Victoria were released on DVD and Blu-ray Disc by Image Entertainment, one of which is also available for digital download on iTunes.  The Blu-ray release is of the opening night performance and the DVD release is of another performance, as the taped opening night performance contained a few minor technical gaffes.

External links 
 
 

1995 television films
1990s musical comedy films
1995 LGBT-related films
1995 films
American musical comedy films
American LGBT-related television films
Compositions by Leslie Bricusse
Films set in Paris
Films directed by Blake Edwards
Films with screenplays by Blake Edwards
Films directed by Matthew Diamond
Films scored by Henry Mancini
Filmed stage productions
Gay-related films
Television shows based on plays
Television remakes of films
Musicals based on films
Cross-dressing in television
Japanese television films
NHK original programming
1990s English-language films
1990s American films